Joint Opposition may refer to:

 Joint Opposition (Sri Lanka), a political alliance in Sri Lanka
 Joint Opposition (Soviet Union), a faction in the All-Union Communist Party (Bolsheviks)